Pocrí is a corregimiento in Aguadulce District, Coclé Province, Panama. Its population as of 1990 was 8,203; its population as of 2000 was 11,124.

References

Corregimientos of Coclé Province